London Buses route 433 is a Transport for London contracted bus route in London, England. Running between Addington Village Interchange and Croydon Town Centre, it is operated by Abellio London.

History
The route was created as a "Tram feeder" service with the opening of Tramlink in 2000. It was numbered T33. In 2015, the route was renumbered 433 as part of wider changes that also saw the withdrawal of routes T31 and T32.

In July 2018, service frequencies at all times were reduced. On 2 November 2019, the route was changed to terminate on Katharine Street instead of calling at West Croydon bus station.

In 2021, Abellio announced it intended to introduce electric buses on the route.

Current route
Route 433 operates via these primary locations:
 Addington Village Interchange  
 Forestdale
 Selsdon
 South Croydon, Farley Road
 South Croydon station 
 East Croydon station  
 Croydon Town Centre, Park Street

References 

Bus routes in London
Transport in the London Borough of Croydon